Express Publishing is an independent UK based publishing house with its headquarters in Berkshire. The company was founded in 1988 and it specializes in English language learning and teaching and ELT educational materials.  Express Publishing has established a presence in more than 90 countries, in many of them holding ministerial approvals.

Key partnerships

 Prosveshcheniye Publishers, Russia
 Aksorn Charoen Tat ACT Co. Ltd., Thailand     
 Ingram Content Group, United States
 TrackTest

Products 

Express Publishing has produced a wide variety of over 3,500 titles of teaching materials, including course books, grammar books, exam material, skills books, English for Specific Purposes books, readers, CD-ROMs, DVD-ROMs, offline interactive whiteboard software, an interactive e-book, and cross-platform application programs.

The interactive whiteboard software caters to instructors' needs for in-class teaching and the interactive e-book product students' learning process for after class practice and activities.

     

In September 2014, Express Publishing introduced Zachary & the Bitterlings and Zachary & the Frostlings, two interactive video games that are designed for students of all ages. The purpose of these two interactive video games is to motivate and assist pupils in developing essential skills while learning English in a game-play environment.

Awards and nominations

Awards 
Express Publishing won the Digita Award 2005 in Germany for the Story of Santa Claus.

Nominations 
British Council has nominated Express Publishing multiple times for the Elton awards: 
 Blockbuster Series (2007) nominated for Product Innovation and Effective Digital Learning.
 Fairyland  series (2008) nominated for Product Innovation and Effective Digital Learning.
 Spark series  (2011) nominated for Product Innovation and Effective Digital Learning.
 Career Paths Beauty Salon (2012) an English for specific purposes book, nominated for Excellence in Course Innovation 
 Happy Rhymes (2013) nominated for Digital Innovation.    
 Discover our Amazing World - CLIL Readers (2014) nominated for Innovation in Learner Resources.
 Pathways to Literature (2015) nominated for Excellence in Course Innovation.

References

External links 
 

Educational publishing companies